The Razors is a punk rock band from Namur, Belgium formed in late 1977 and split in September 1978.

Mainly influenced by The Ramones and the early British punk rock scene, the Razors quickly made theirs this new principle: "We don't know how to play music. Well, who cares? Let's do it anyway !"
They played very short and fast 1-2-3-4 style punk rock songs. The lyrics, when not playing covers from The Stooges or Sham 69, were written by Chris Azoeuf alias Chris Toulouse (in very poor English) and were clearly politically (left-wing) oriented.

Their concerts were characterized by "some" disruptance and some ended in a mess (the horse-mounted police charged the band and the crowd at an open-air concert).

After the split, each went into other musical projects, playing again with one or another and from time to time.
Pascal Gabriel alias Gaby Siclet, Bob and Chris set up the Bananas for a few months. Then Rudï and Chris along with Marcel Deroeck formed Acné Juvénile.
Gaby, soon after, left for London and since then has pursued a productive musical career.

Line-up
 Chris Azoeuf, alias Chris Toulouse: lead vocals.
 Jean-Pol Sohet, aliasBob Fuckly: drums and backup vocals.
 Pascal Gabriel alias Gaby Siclet: bass guitar and backup vocals.
 Rudy Peret alias Rudï: guitar and backup vocals.
 Jean-Louis Pierlot as occasional saxophonist.

Concerts
 ??/??/1978: Le Magic Bus (Charleroi).
 1978-03-18: First Belgian Punk Contest (Brussels).
 1978-04-13: Bourse du Commerce (Namur). Organisé par le mensuel de rock'music "La Gazette". Au programme: The Razors, Back Lavatory et The Kids.
 ??/??/1978: Place du Vieux Marché (Namur).
 1978-04-30: Grimmerin (Grimbergen). With X-Pulsion.
 1978-04-30: Festival (Chênée). With Cell 609 and Boule and the Fixators
 ??/??/1978: Place du Vieux Marché (Namur).
 ??/??/1978: Collège (Erpent).
 1978-05-20: Super Nouba d'En Attendant (Brussels). With Mad Virgins, Streets... 
 ??/??/1978: Hôtel de Ville (Andenne).
 ??/??/1978: Le Magic Bus (Charleroi).
 1978-06-27: Le Florio (Brussels).
 ??/??/1978: Le Chat Pitre en Folie (Andenne).
 ??/??/1978: Bas Enhaive (Jambes).
 ??/??/1978: Citadelle (Namur). Dans le décor historique des vieux murs de la Citadelle, un concert plein d'énergie. La gendarmerie à cheval à chargé pour arrêter le concert... et les Razors ne voulaitent pas arrêter...

Record(s)
 One song on the live LP 'First Belgian Punk Contest'.
 5 songs on the live LP 'First Belgian Punk Contest vol. 2'.

See also
 Punk rock in Belgium

Musical groups established in 1977
Musical groups disestablished in 1978
Belgian punk rock groups